Varzi is a comune in the Province of Pavia, Lombardy, Italy.

Varzi may also refer to:

Achille Varzi (1904–1948), Italian racecar driver
Achille Varzi (philosopher) (born 1958), Italian philosopher
Elena Varzi (1926–2014), Italian actress
Mortezâ Varzi (1922–2004), Iranian musician
Roxanne Varzi (born 1971), Iranian-American anthropologist, academic, and filmmaker

See also
Lazaros Varzis (fl. late-19th/early-20th centuries), Greek chieftain of the Macedonian Struggle
Varzy, a commune of Nièvre département, France